Huernia pillansii, called the cocklebur, is a species of flowering plant in the genus Huernia, native to the Cape Provinces of South Africa. A succulent, it has gained the Royal Horticultural Society's Award of Garden Merit as a hothouse ornamental.

References

pillansii
Flora of the Cape Provinces
Endemic flora of South Africa
Plants described in 1904
Taxa named by N. E. Brown